Cooper Lake State Park is a Texas State Park in Delta and Hopkins counties, about three miles (5 km) south of Cooper, Texas. The park is situated on Jim Chapman Lake, formerly known as Cooper Lake. There are actually two geographically separate units; the Doctors Creek unit  is located on the north side of the lake, in Delta County, while the South Sulphur unit  is located on the south side of the lake, in Hopkins County.

History

The park's land was inhabited by Caddo people until the 1800s, when settlers brought the agriculture (including cotton and dairy) and livestock industries to the area. Cooper Lake itself was built between 1986 and 1991, by the U.S. Army Corps of Engineers.

Nature
The park lies at the intersection of the Tallgrass Prairie and Post Oak Savannah ecoregions. There is a diverse variety of mammals (including the gray fox and nine-banded armadillo) and birds in the park, and multiple species of catfish, crappie, and bass in the lake.

References

External links
 Texas Parks and Wildlife Department

Lakes of Texas
State parks of Texas
Protected areas of Delta County, Texas
Protected areas of Hopkins County, Texas
Bodies of water of Delta County, Texas
Bodies of water of Hopkins County, Texas